John Raymond Johnson is Shawnee politician. He is the governor of the Absentee Shawnee Tribe of Indians.

Early life and education

Johnson attended Norman High School.

Career

Johnson worked in the optometry industry for 35 years. He started his own business in 2004 and eventually retired.

Politics

In 2019, Johnson became governor of the Absentee Shawnee Tribe of Indians. During his tenure, he seeks to expand business opportunities for the tribe, including securing federal contracting, including partnering with other tribes to execute projects. During his tenure, the tribe broke ground on a new health care center expansion in Little Axe, Oklahoma. He also created a relief fund for tribal members from CARES Act monies, during the height of the COVID-19 pandemic, distributing checks to people in need.

Personal life

Johnson married his wife, Janet, in the late 1970s. They have two children.

References

Governors of the Absentee Shawnee Tribe of Indians
People from Norman, Oklahoma
Businesspeople from Oklahoma
20th-century American businesspeople
21st-century American businesspeople
21st-century Native American politicians
Native American men in politics
Year of birth missing (living people)
Living people